J. L. T. E. Dassenaike was the 24th Surveyor General of Sri Lanka. He was appointed in 1961, succeeding V. Rasaretnam, and held the office until 1961. He was succeeded by S. Karthigesu.

References

D